The International Festival of Ancient Greek Drama is a theatre festival that takes place every summer in Cyprus. It is organised by the Cyprus Centre of International Theatre Institute, the Deputy Ministry of Culture and the Deputy Ministry of Tourism of the Republic of Cyprus. It began in 1997 and is an annual event which attracts professional theatre companies from various parts of the world. It has hosted companies from Greece, Britain, United States, Germany, Russia, Romania, Sweden, Croatia, Bulgaria, Italy, Austria, Korea, Slovenia, China, Cyprus and many more. This wide international participation in the Festival helps to bring out the universality of ancient Greek drama and underline its living presence in today's world. The Festival is held in July and early August when Cyprus attracts visitors from all over the world. Thus with its performances, it brings ancient Greek drama into contact with a multicultural audience. The performances take place at various venues around Cyprus including the ancient amphitheatre at Kourion, the Paphos Ancient Odeon and the Makarios III Amphitheatre in Nicosia.

16th International Festival of Ancient Greek Drama 2012 participants

15th International Festival of Ancient Greek Drama 2011 participants

14th International Festival of Ancient Greek Drama 2010 participants

13th International Festival of Ancient Greek Drama 2009 participants

12th International Festival of Ancient Greek Drama 2008 participants

References

External links
 Festival Programme

Theatre in Cyprus
Theatre festivals in Cyprus
Summer events in Cyprus